Yaragudipadi Venkata Mahalakshmi (born 13 December 1952), known professionally as Lakshmi, is an Indian actress known for her works primarily in the southern film industry (distributing her acting career in almost each Dravidian language equally), along with some Hindi films. She made her film debut through a Tamil film Sri Valli in 1961. Her debut as an actress happened with the Tamil film Jeevanaamsam in 1968. In the same year, she also debuted in Kannada and Telugu films with Goa Dalli CID 999 and Bandhavyalu, respectively.

In 1974, her debut Malayalam film, Chattakari went on to become a blockbuster throughout India. Her performance in Mithunam (2012) is regarded as one of the 100 Greatest Performances of the Decade by Film Companion. Lakshmi then went on to appear in a number of commercially successful films in various languages without a hesitation or diction. She dubs her voice for all of her movies, irrespective of the language and remains one of the very few critically acclaimed stars to achieve this stage.

She has won one National Film Award for Best Actress, nine Filmfare Awards South, three Nandi Awards, Kerala State Film Award for Best Actress, Karnataka State Film Award for Best Actress for the movie Hoovu Hannu, the Bengal Film Journalists Association Awards and various other state awards.

Lakshmi made her Bollywood debut in 1975, with the woman-centric Julie, the remake of Malayalam film Chattakkari. After appearing as a lead actress for more than a decade, she switched over to character roles. She is the only actress who has won the Filmfare Awards South in all four south languages as Filmfare Award Best Actress for eight times in various Indian languages. Till now she is the only actress who has won Filmfare award for best actress in all the 5 major film industries namely Hindi, Tamil, Telugu, Kannada and Malayalam. Till now no South actress has won state award in all the 4 south states except Lakshmi. She is also the only Actress who has won Tamil Nadu, Andhra Pradesh, Karnataka and Kerala State Film Awards for best Actress and the National Award. This makes her the most versatile and popular actress across South India and also in the Hindi Belt which is now referred as Pan India, so she was one among the early pan Indian star.

Early life

Lakshmi was born and raised in Chennai, Tamil Nadu. Her mother Kumari Rukmini was a Tamil actress. Her father, Yaragudipati Varada Rao, was a Telugu producer, director, thespian, screenwriter, editor and actor known for his works predominantly in Telugu, Kannada, Malayalam and Tamil cinema.

Career

She established herself as a successful and popular actress in South India in the 1970s, acting in all four South Indian languages: Tamil, Telugu, Malayalam and Kannada. Lakshmi rose to fame with her first Malayalam movie Chattakari (1974), which won her the Kerala State Film Award for Best Actress. This has the distinction of being the first Malayalam film to run continuously for 40 weeks in a Bangalore theatre. Chattakari (1974) was remade in Hindi as Julie (1975) and in Telugu as Miss Julie Prema Katha (1975). In addition to a Filmfare Best Actress Award, she also won the Bengal Film Journalists' Association Awards for the "most outstanding work of the year", for her work in Julie. She is known for her versatility as an actress and for the glamorous outlook she embodied. Her acting in the Telugu film Panthulamma is often credited as one of her best performances.

After the success of her debut Malayalam film Chattakari, she starred in many other films in Malayalam. She won Filmfare Awards for Best Actress for her performances in Chalanum and Mohiniyaattam. 

She has acted with almost all the leading actors and stars of South India, but it was her combination with the famous Kannada star Anant Nag in the 70s and 80s that struck a chord with the audience. Nag and Lakshmi are considered one of the all-time greatest pairs in South Indian cinema. They acted together in more than 25 films. Their pair was considered the right recipe for success. Most of the films based on TaRaSu novels were based on the life of young middle class couples.

After her success in Julie, however, Lakshmi didn't star in many Hindi films and instead concentrated on doing more South Indian films. She won the National Film Award for Best Actress for Sila Nerangalil Sila Manithargal (1977), becoming one of the first South Indian actresses to win  that category for a Tamil film. When her career as a leading lady ended in the 1980s, she started playing supporting roles as a mother and later as grandmother. She played Aishwarya Rai's grandmother in the Tamil musical blockbuster film, Jeans (1998) and Kareena Kapoor's grandmother in the hit film, Hulchul (2004).

She has performed in more than 400 films and has also been involved in politics.

Under K. Balachander's supervision, she made her directorial debut with a remake of Yours, Mine and Ours: the Kannada film Makkala Sainya (1980 Tamil version Mazhalai Pattalam).

Lakshmi is fluent in all four South Indian languages. She took a break from acting to host two talk shows, including the Tamil talk show Achamillai, Achamillai.She hosted a talk show in Kannada for Suvarna channel called Idu Kathe Alla Jeevana. She also hosts a talk show in Tamil for Vijay TV called Kadhai Alla Nijam. She has hosted a talk show in Kannada for Suvarna channel called Neena? Naana?

After the shows ended, she returned to act in films. 

Currently she is on the judges' panel for the Malayalam reality show Champions on Surya TV. She is also a judge for a Kannada reality show called Drama Juniors on Zee Kannada. She has overall appeared in precisely 333 films- 128 in Tamil, 76 in Telugu, 65 in Malayalam, 58 in Kannada and just 6 in Hindi.

Personal life

Her first marriage was to Bhaskar in 1969, who worked with an insurance organization. The couple have only one biological daughter, actress Aishwarya, born in 1971. However, Lakshmi divorced Bhaskar in 1974.

Her second marriage was with her co-star Mohan Sharma on the sets of Chattakari and married him in 1975, but it ended in divorce in 1980.

While she was shooting En Uyir Kannamma (1988), she and actor-director M. Sivachandran fell in love and got married in 1987. The couple adopted a girl named Samyuktha in 2000.

Awards

National Film Awards
 1977 – National Film Award for Best Actress for Sila Nerangalil Sila Manithargal

Filmfare Awards
 1976 – Filmfare Award for Best Actress for Julie

Filmfare Awards South
 1974 – Filmfare Award for Best Tamil Actress for Dikkatra Parvathi
 1974 – Filmfare Award for Best Malayalam Actress for Chattakari
 1975 – Filmfare Award for Best Malayalam Actress for Chalanum
 1976 – Filmfare Award for Best Malayalam Actress for Mohiniyaattam
 1978 - Filmfare Special Jury Award for Panthulamma
 1983 – Filmfare Award for Best Tamil Actress for Unmaigal
 1986 – Filmfare Award for Best Telugu Actress for Sravana Meghalu
 1993 – Filmfare Award for Best Kannada Actress for Hoovu Hannu
 1998 – Filmfare Lifetime Achievement Award (South)

Cinema Express Awards
 1986 – Cinema Express Award for Best Actress – Tamil for Samsaram Adhu Minsaram

Nandi Awards
 Best Actress - Panthulamma (1977)
 Best Actress - Sravana Meghalu (1986)
 Best Character Actress - Murari (2001)
 Special Jury Award - Mithunam (2012)

Karnataka State Film Awards
 1993 – Best Actress for Hoovu Hannu
 2008 – Best Supporting Actress for Vamshi
 2017 – Dr. Rajkumar Award (Highest honor in the Kannada Film Industry).

Tamil Nadu State Film Awards
 1978 – Tamil Nadu State Film Award for Best Actress for Oru Nadigai Naatakam Paarkiraal

Kerala State Film Awards
 1974 – Kerala State Film Award for Best Actress for Chattakari

Bengal Film Journalists Association Awards
 1975 - Most outstanding work of the year for Julie

South India International Movie Awards
 2021 – SIIMA Award for Best Actress in a Supporting Role for Oh! Baby

Notable filmography

Tamil

Telugu

Malayalam

Kannada

Hindi

TV serials
 Adutha Veetu Kavithai
 Nallathor Veenai
 Mahalakshmi
 TBA - Sweet Kaaram Coffee - Webseries

TV shows
Kannadada Kotyadhipati as Contestant
Kadhai Alla Nijam reality show in Vijay TV
 Neena Naana as Host
 Champions as Judge
 Drama Juniors as Judge
 Kathe alla jeevana Kannada Reality show

References

External links
 

1952 births
Living people
Kerala State Film Award winners
Indian film actresses
Actresses in Malayalam cinema
Actresses from Chennai
Best Actress National Film Award winners
Actresses in Tamil cinema
Actresses in Kannada cinema
Tamil Nadu State Film Awards winners
Filmfare Awards South winners
20th-century Indian actresses
21st-century Indian actresses
Nandi Award winners
Actresses in Tamil television
Television personalities from Tamil Nadu
Filmfare Awards winners
Recipients of the Rajyotsava Award 2016
Telugu people
South Indian International Movie Awards winners